Ernesto Pimentel Yesquén (born September 20, 1970), also known by his stage name La Chola Chabuca, is a popular Peruvian televisionpersonality. He has had a show on América Televisión for the past 15 years.

Pimentel takes his stage name "La Chola" from the Peruvian term for women who live in the mountains of Peru.  He fashions his costumes based on their traditional dress. Unlike other Peruvian entertainers, though, he aims to glamorize these women with beautiful dresses.  As a result, he is particularly popular with the rural population of Peru.

Pimentel's career until the early 1990s was as his La Chola persona. He currently produces and stars in the La Chola Chabuca Circo (Circus), a popular annual event in July and August. Pimental is also a real estate entrepreneur involved in residential real estate construction.

TV Shows  
 Risas y salsa (1996-1997)
 Aló Chabuca (1996-1997)
 Risas de América (1998, 2012-2013)
 Chola de Miércoles (1997-1999)
 Más Chola que Nunca (2000-2001)
 Hola Chola (2001)
 Más Chola Latina (2001-2002)
 Sabadazo (2002)
 Recargados de risa (2005-2011)
 Gud nay Chabuca (2014)
 Esta noche (2013-2014).
 El reventonazo de la chola (since 2015).

References

Drag queens
LGBT in Peru